Blucksberg Mountain is an unincorporated community and census-designated place in Meade County, South Dakota, United States. Its population was 467 as of the 2020 census. Interstate 90 passes through the community.

Geography

Demographics

References

Unincorporated communities in Meade County, South Dakota
Unincorporated communities in South Dakota
Census-designated places in Meade County, South Dakota
Census-designated places in South Dakota